The Honda XBR 500 is a 500cc Japanese sports motorcycle launched by Honda in 1985 and in response to the Yamaha SR500. It is powered by a single-cylinder four-valve engine with the valves arranged radially relative to the geometric centre of the hemispherical combustion chamber - (Honda's Radial Four Valve Combustion Chamber, or RFVC) and actuated via intermediate sub-rockers. Displacing  and producing 27 or 44 hp (depending upon specific market legislation), the engine, having its origins in the Honda XR series off-road models, features a "quasi-dry sump", the bulk of the oil being stored in a separate tank below the seat but a proportion (ca. 0,5 litres) of the lubricant remaining in the crankcase sump. The steel-braided hoses connecting the oil tank to the engine (clearly visible at the right-hand side of the motorcycle) are a strong visual element.

The two exhaust valves enabled the motorcycle to be fitted with two separate exhaust systems. The motorcycle had both an electric start and a kick start. On earlier models, the kick start was linked by a cable to an exhaust valve decompressor to reduce cylinder compression during manual engine starting; later examples incorporated an automatic valve lifter with the camshaft. This also assisted in reducing the starter motor loads. The fuel-efficient engine combined with the large fuel tank capacity (20 litres/5,28 US galls) provided the bike with a long range (typically well in excess of 200 miles) between refueling.

XBR500s (F,G and some H sub-types) were fitted with 18" Comstar wheels and tubeless tyres, 100/90 front and 110/90 rear. The frame was of a single-downtube, dual-cradle design having a box-section swinging arm and conventionally sprung rear suspension.  The last iterations - some XBR500H and all XBR500SJ types - were supplied with traditional wire wheels and tubed tyres. The XBR500 is a fine-handling machine with sprightly performance and a wheelbase of 1,400 mm (55 in). A detachable pillion seat cover was supplied to simulate a café-racer look, but Honda subsequently released a dedicated café racer version of near-identical mechanical specification although of less power - the Honda GB500 TT - which featured some "classic British qualities", such as a solo seat, seat hump, wire wheels, two-into-one exhaust system and a fuel-tank with gold pinstriping reminiscent of the earlier AJS and Velocette machines.

References 

XBR500
Sport bikes
Motorcycles introduced in 1985